Cerceris clypeata is a species of weevil wasp in the family Crabronidae. It is found in North America.

References

External links

Crabronidae
Articles created by Qbugbot
Insects described in 1844